A list of Japanese radars used during World War II.

Army radar
Radar used by the Imperial Japanese Army.

Ground-based radar 
Ta-Chi 1 Ground-Based Target Tracking Radar Model 1 - SCR-268 1.5 meter band (200 MHz) derivative built in small numbers 
Ta-Chi 2 Ground-Based Target Tracking Radar Model 2 - SCR-268 1.5 meter band (200 MHz) derivative built in small numbers 
Ta-Chi 3 Ground-Based Target Tracking Radar Model 3 - (Based on British GL sets captured in Singapore) - 3.75 m (80 MHz) pw = 1 or 2 us, Power = 50 kW, PRF = 1 or 2 kHz (range 40 km), 150 built by Sumitomo Entered service early 1944. Yagi Antenna 
Ta-Chi 4 Ground-Based Target Tracking Radar Model 4 - SCR-268 1.5 meter band (200 MHz) derivative built in small numbers 
Type A Bi-static Doppler Interface Detector (High Frequency Warning Device "Ko") 
Ta-Chi 6 TypeB Fixed Early Warning Device (Fixed Early Warning Device "Otsu") 1943 - 3 meter band (100 MHz) - 60 built
Ta-Chi 7 TypeB Mobile Early Warning Device (Mobile Early Warning Device "Otsu") Transportable version of the Ta-Chi 6
Ta-Chi 13 Aircraft Guidance System 
Ta-Chi 18 TypeB Portable Early Warning Device (Portable Early Warning Device "Otsu") - 3 meter band (100 MHz) - 400 built
Ta-Chi 20 Fixed Early Warning Device Receiver (for Ta-Chi 6) 
Ta-Chi 24 Mobil Anti-Aircraft Radar (Japanese-built Würzburg radar) 
Ta-Chi 28 Aircraft Guidance Device 
Ta-Chi 31 Ground-Based Target Tracking Radar Model 4 Modify
Ta-Chi 35 Height finding radar

Airborne radar 
Ta-Ki 1 Model 1 Airborne Surveillance Radar 
Ta-Ki 1 Model 2 Airborne Surveillance Radar 
Ta-Ki 1 Model 3 Airborne Surveillance Radar 
Ta-Ki 11 ECM Device 
Ta-Ki 15 Aircraft Guidance Device Receiver (for Ta-Chi 13)

Shipborne radar 
Ta-Se 1 Anti-Surface Radar 
Ta-Se 2 Anti-Surface Radar

Medium bomber, with control air-to-air missile device
Mitsubishi Ki-67 Hiryu "Peggy" I KAI Go-IA: This experimental modification was for managed air-to-air guided missile evaluations, during 1944–1945.

Guided missiles 
Kawasaki Ki-147 I-Go Type1 – Ko Air-to-Surface Radio Guidance Missile 
Mitsubishi Ki-148 I-Go Type1-Otsu Air to Surface Radio Guidance 
Missile I-Go Type 1-Hei 
"Ke-Go" IR Guidance Air to Surface Missile

Navy radar
Radar used by the Imperial Japanese Navy

Land-based radar

Airborne radar  

 Type 5 Model 1 Radio Location Night Vision Device

Shipborne radar  
 Type 2 Mark 2 Model 1 Air Search Radar ("21-Go" Air Search Radar) 
 Type 2 Mark 2 Model 2 Modify 3 Anti-Surface, Fire-assisting Radar for Submarine ("21-Go" Modify 3 Anti-Surface, Fire-assisting Radar) 
 Type 2 Mark 2 Model 2 Modify 4 Anti-Surface, Fire-assisting Radar for Ship ("21-Go" Modify 4 Anti-Surface, Fire-assisting Radar) 
 Type 2 Mark 3 Model 1 Anti-Surface Fire-Control Radar ("31-Go" Anti Surface Fire-Control Radar) 
 Type 2 Mark 3 Model 2 Anti-Surface Fire-Control Radar ("32-Go" Anti Surface Fire-Control Radar) 
 Type 2 Mark 3 Model 3 Anti-Surface Fire-Control Radar ("33-Go" Anti Surface Fire-Control Radar)

Radar-equipped bomber devices for maritime reconnaissance/antisubmarine patrol 
 Mitsubishi G3M3 (Model 23) "Nell": This bomber for long range capacity, in 1943, was used as a Maritime reconnaissance/Radar aircraft for long range missions and some electronic warfare work in the seas.
 Mitsubishi G4M1 (Model 11/12) "Betty": From 1942, the G4M of this model was also used for the same purpose as the G3M bomber, for maritime long range capacities with sea radar and electronic warfare equipment.
 Nakajima B5N2 "Kate"/Nakajima B6N1-2 Tenzan "Jill": In 1944, some torpedo bombers of mentioned types used with antisubmarine, radar detection (with finding radar equipment) and similar purposes in maritime short or medium range missions from carriers or land bases.
 Aichi E13A1b "Jake" Mark 11B: like model 11A, added Air-Surface radar and other night conversion with radar (E13A1b-S).
 Kawanishi H6K2,4 and 5 "Mavis" Marks 11,22 and 23: More powerful engines, for ultra long range missions, long range sea radio equipment and air-surface finding radar added.
 Kawanishi H8K2 "Emily" Mark 12: more potent engines for ultra-long range maritime recon missions, major heavy armament; also long range sea radio equipment and air-surface search radar added
 Kawanishi E7K2 "Alf" Mark 2: short range hydroplane, was installing magnetic detection equipment and finding surface radar for short range patrol and antisubmarine missions
 Kyushu Q3W1 Nankai (South Sea): two place version of training aircraft Kyūshū K11W1 Shiragiku, for anti-submarine patrol - was equipped with sea-surface finding antisubmarine sonar (one prototype)
 Kyūshū Q1W1 Tokai "Lorna": Anti-submarine patrol aircraft. Was equipped with sea-surface radar and antisubmarine equipment for escorted convoys in the East China Sea, the Yellow Sea and the Sea of Japan during short times in 1944-45.
 Mitsubishi Q2M Taiyō: Advanced Antisubmarine patrol design, derived from Mitsubishi Ki-67 Hiryū "Peggy" Bomber. Was equipped with magnetic antisubmarine search device, air-surface radar and electronic warfare equipment.

Navy air guided missiles 
 Funryu Type1 Surface to Air Radio Guidance Missile 
 Funryu Type2 Surface to Air Radio Guidance Missile 
 Funryu Type3 Surface to Air Radio Guidance Missile 
 Funryu Type4 Surface to Air Radio Guidance Missile

References 

Japan
World War II radars
Military history of Japan during World War II
World War II radars
Radar
Radar
World War II
World War II, radar
Radars